J&L Grubb is an Irish cheese manufacturer, making cows' milk and goats' milk cheeses on their farm near Fethard, South Tipperary.

History
In 1984, the Grubbs began to make around eight Cashel Blue cheeses at their farm from the milk of their own herd of Holstein-Friesian cows.  Originally the cheese was produced using an old 90-litre copper brewer's vat and sold in local shops and markets.

In 1991, the Grubbs were joined by Guert Van den Dikkenberg who became their head cheesemaker.

In 1993, Henry Brown, a nephew of Louis Grubb, began to make blue cheese from sheep's milk but it wasn't until 1999 that the cheese was manufactured in commercial quantities at Grubb's facilities.

Types

Cashel Blue
Cashel Blue is a hand-made, semi-soft, mildly blue veined and slightly acidic blue cheese with a creamy texture, made from cows milk.  Over half the milk used in the production of Cashel Blue comes from their own farm, with the rest sourced from farms located nearby.  The cheese was named after the Rock of Cashel overlooking the pastures close to the farm. It has large blue flecks, made by the action of Penicillium roqueforti, the same fungus used in Roquefort, Stilton, and other blue cheeses.

Crozier Blue
Crozier Blue is a hand-made, semi-soft, blue-veined, medium-strength blue cheese with a creamy texture. Made in Ireland, this is one of the country's few blue cheeses, made from sheep's milk. It is made on the farm of Jane and Louis Grubb by their daughter Sarah Furno. Crozier Blue is a more recent creation from the farm which produces a sister cheese Cashel Blue cheese made using cow's milk.

Awards
Cashel Blue is widely acclaimed and has won numerous awards.  The highlights are:
 1993: First (Blue Cheese Class ) Royal Dublin Society Farmhouse Cheese Competition
 1998: Silver, Ireland's International Cheese Awards
 2000: Gold, British Cheese Awards
 2001: Gold, World Cheese Awards
 2002: Bronze, World Cheese Awards
 2004: Bronze, British Cheese Awards
 2004: Gold, Listowel Food Fair, National Farmhouse Cheese Competition (Ireland)
 2005: Bronze British Cheese Awards
 2006: Gold, World Cheese Awards
 2009: Gold, Bronze, World Cheese Awards
 2010: Gold, World Cheese Awards
 2012: Silver, World Cheese Awards
 2013: Bronze, World Cheese Awards
 2014: Gold, International Cheese Awards
 2014: Gold, Irish Cheese Awards
 2015: Silver, Mondial Du Fromage
 2016: Gold, World Cheese Awards
 2017: Gold, World Cheese Awards
 2017: Gold, International Cheese Awards
 2019: Bronze, World Cheese Awards
 2021: Gold, Irish Cheese Awards
 2021: Gold, International Cheese Awards

Crozier Blue has won many prestigious awards, the highlights being:
 2003: Gold, British Cheese Awards
 2003: Gold, World Cheese Awards
 2007: Supreme Champion, Premio Roma
 2010: Gold, World Cheese Awards
 2011: Gold, Irish Cheese Awards
 2012: Gold, Irish Cheese Awards
 2013: Gold, Irish Cheese Awards
 2015: Super Gold, World Cheese Awards
 2017: Super Gold, Mondial Du Fromage
 2017: Gold, Irish Cheese Awards
 2018: Silver, World Cheese Awards
 2019: Gold, World Cheese Awards
 2019: Gold, Irish Cheese Awards
 2021: Super Gold, World Cheese Awards

References

Irish cheeses
Blue cheeses